Following the 2018 Lebanese parliamentary elections, the first held in the country since 2009, 128 candidates were elected to the Lebanese Parliament for a duration of four years. Per the Lebanese Constitution half of these MPs are Christian and half are Muslim with proportional representation among the different confessions within each religion: 34 Maronites, 27 Sunni, 27 Shia, 14 Greek Orthodox, 8 Greek Catholics, 8 Druze, 5 Armenian Orthodox, 2 Alawites, 1 Armenian Catholic, 1 Protestant and 1 member representing the 12 Christian minorities

See also 
 2018 Lebanese general election
 Members of the 2005–2009 Lebanese Parliament
 List of members of the 2009–2017 Lebanese Parliament

References

Lists of members of the Parliament of Lebanon by term